Arkansas State University (A-State or ASU) is a public research university in Jonesboro, Arkansas.  It is the flagship campus of the Arkansas State University System and the second largest university in the state. The university was founded in 1909 and is located atop  on Crowley's Ridge.

Arkansas State University is classified among "R2: Doctoral Universities – High research activity".

History
A-State was founded as the First District Agricultural School in Jonesboro in 1909 by the Arkansas Legislature as a regional agricultural training school. Robert W. Glover, a Missionary Baptist pastor who served in both houses of the Arkansas Legislature from Sheridan (1905–1912), introduced in 1909 the resolution calling for the establishment of four state agricultural colleges, including the future ASU.

In 1918, ASU began offering a two-year college program. In 1925, it became First District Agricultural and Mechanical College. A four-year degree program was begun in 1930. A & M College became Arkansas State College in 1933. In 1967, the Arkansas Legislature elevated the college to university status and changed the name to Arkansas State University.

In the fall of 2014, A-State welcomed its most academically prepared freshman class.  The result of several years of growing both admission standards and increasing on-campus housing, A-State's incoming first-year first-time student composite ACT was 23.9 with an average high school GPA of 3.47.  This was the third consecutive year of improvement for the ACT/GPA freshman classes for Arkansas State. The Arkansas State Honors College has grown 59% since 2009. The university also posted back-to-back high graduate counts in spring 2012 and spring 2013, producing the most graduates in a two-year period in school history. The university contains the largest library in the state of Arkansas, the Dean B. Ellis Library.

Campuses
 Arkansas State University, Jonesboro, Arkansas (primary campus)
Arkansas State University Campus Queretaro, Querétaro, Mexico 
 Arkansas State University-Beebe, Beebe, Arkansas
 Arkansas State University-Beebe Searcy Campus, Searcy, Arkansas
 Arkansas State University-Beebe Heber Springs Campus, Heber Springs, Arkansas
 Arkansas State University-Beebe at Little Rock Air Force Base, Jacksonville, Arkansas
 Arkansas State University-Newport, Newport, Arkansas
 Arkansas State University-Newport Marked Tree Campus, Marked Tree, Arkansas
Arkansas State University-Newport Jonesboro Campus, Jonesboro, Arkansas
 Arkansas State University-Mountain Home, Mountain Home, Arkansas
 Arkansas State University Mid-South, West Memphis, Arkansas
 Arkansas State University Three Rivers, Malvern, Arkansas
Henderson State University, Arkadelphia, Arkansas

Former Campuses
 Arkansas State University-Paragould, an instructional site of the Jonesboro campus. (closed in 2018)

For more information on the Arkansas State University System, see Arkansas State University System.

Academics

Master's degree graduate programs were initiated in 1955, and ASU began offering its first doctoral degree, in educational leadership, in the fall of 1992. A second doctoral program, in environmental science, was begun in the fall of 1997, and the doctoral program in heritage studies began in the fall of 2001. Newer doctoral programs are in environmental science, molecular biosciences, and physical therapy. In the fall of 2016, Arkansas State enrolled the first class of approximately 115 students to its branch of the New York Institute of Technology's medical school. The medical school is located on campus in the historic Wilson Hall.

In 2018, Arkansas State was classified among "R2: Doctoral Universities – High research activity". The university nevertheless maintains a focus on undergraduate instruction and small class sizes, with a student-faculty ratio of 16:1, ranked #76 in undergraduate teaching nationwide .

Today, the institution has more than 100,000 alumni. Programs at the doctorate, specialist's, master's, bachelor's, and associate degree levels are available through the various colleges: Agriculture, Engineering & Technology, Business, Education & Behavioral Science, Liberal Arts & Communication, Nursing & Health Professions, Sciences & Mathematics, and Undergraduate Studies.

Media
A-State's journalism program reorganized into the College of Media and Communication for fall 2013.  The College of Media and Communication is home to three student-led media outlets and a NPR affiliate radio station. The Herald, a weekly student newspaper, was founded in 1921 and has a circulation of 5,000. ASU-TV, a program under the Department of Radio-Television, gives students hands-on experience in the field of television broadcasting. Starting in fall 2013, an Internet-based student radio station, Red Wolf Radio, was added to the student media.  Arkansas State is also home to KASU, a 100,000-watt FM station, which is the oldest NPR affiliate west of the Mississippi River.

Athletics

Arkansas State participates as a member of the NCAA Division I Sun Belt Conference.  The athletic teams, previously known as the Indians, are now known as the Red Wolves.

In 2012, the Red Wolves football team became Sun Belt Conference champions for a second straight year, finishing the regular season with a 9–3 record, and capped off its successful season with its first bowl game victory since becoming a Division I-A (FBS) program with a 17–13 victory over Kent State in the GoDaddy.com Bowl, as well as earning its first win over a ranked opponent since joining the FBS in 1992.

In 2013, the football team became the Sun Belt Conference champions for a third straight year, finishing with a 7-5 regular season record and won a second consecutive GoDaddy Bowl with a 23–20 victory over then 10-2 Ball State.

Greek life

Approximately 15% of ASU's undergraduate students are members of one of the 21 Greek organizations located on the campus.

Sororities
 Alpha Gamma Delta 1948
 Alpha Kappa Alpha 1973
 Alpha Omicron Pi 1949 
 Chi Omega 1961 
 Delta Sigma Theta 1973 (reinstated in 2019)
 Delta Zeta 1991
Sigma Gamma Rho 2001
 Zeta Phi Beta 1986
 Zeta Tau Alpha 1968 (reinstated in 2012)

Fraternities
 Alpha Gamma Rho 1969
 Alpha Phi Alpha 1973
 Alpha Tau Omega 1968
 Kappa Alpha Order 1967 
 Kappa Alpha Psi 1975 
 Kappa Sigma 2014
 Lambda Chi Alpha 1959
 Phi Beta Sigma 1979
 Phi Delta Theta 2020
 Pi Kappa Alpha 1948 
 Omega Psi Phi 1973
 Sigma Chi 1987
 Tau Kappa Epsilon 1949 (reinstated in 2016)

Disbanded Greek Organizations
Sororities
Phi Mu 1951-?
Kappa Delta 1968-?
Fraternities
Beta Gamma Beta 1977-?
Nu Gamma Alpha 1979-?
Sigma Pi 1949-2021
Sigma Phi Epsilon 1955-?

Notable alumni

 Ann Clemmer - Republican former member of the Arkansas State House of Representatives from Saline County
 Adrian Banks -American-Israeli professional basketball player for Hapoel Tel Aviv of the Israeli Basketball Super League
 Bill Bergey - NFL player
 Larry P. Arnn – president, Hillsdale College
 Fred Barnett – NFL player 
 Mike Beebe – governor of Arkansas (2006–2014)
 Earl Bell – Olympic bronze medalist in pole vaulting (1984) and former world record holder
 Darren Benson – NFL player
 Lonnie D. Bentley – professor and the department head of computer and information technology at Purdue University
 Gene Bradley – USFL player and NFL draftee
 Ray Brown – NFL player  
 Rodger Bumpass – comedian and voice of Squidward on the popular TV show SpongeBob SquarePants 
 Ronald R. Caldwell – Arkansas state senator from District 23; real estate businessman in Wynne
 Davy Carter – former Speaker of the Arkansas House of Representatives, banker and attorney
 Maurice Carthon – NFL player and coach 
 Rick Crawford – U.S. Representative for the First District of Arkansas. 
 Demario Davis – NFL player
 John Dickson- former ABA player 
 Patrick Eddie – NBA player
 Carlos Emmons – NFL player 
 Jake Files (bachelor's degree in accounting) – former state senator from District 8 in Fort Smith  
 Brad Franchione – two-time NJCAA National Championship head football coach 
 Jeremy Gillam – farmer and former Speaker of the Arkansas House of Representatives from White County
 Michael John Gray (B.S. marketing) – former Democratic member of the Arkansas House of Representatives from Woodruff County; a farmer with a law degree 
 Michelle Gray (Class of 1999, B.S. accounting) – Republican member of the Arkansas House of Representatives from Melbourne in Izard County 
 Leroy Harris – NFL player
 Jeff Hartwig – former U.S. record holder in pole vault 
 Julia Butterfly Hill – environmental activist
 Thomas Hill – Olympic bronze medalist in 110-meter hurdles (1972)
 Robert C. Hinson – U.S. Air Force lieutenant general 
 Beth Holloway – speech pathologist and motivational speaker, mother of Natalee Holloway 
 V. E. Howard, Church of Christ clergyman who started the radio International Gospel Hour, based originally in Texarkana, Texas
 John K. Hutchison, former Republican member of the Arkansas House of Representatives from 2013 to 2015; farmer in Harrisburg
 Buddy Jewell, country music singer
 Blake Johnson (exercise science) – Republican member of the Arkansas State Senate from Clay County; rice and soybean farmer in Corning
 David Johnson – NFL player
 Tyrell Johnson – NFL player, Minnesota Vikings, Detroit Lions 
 Ken Jones – NFL player  
 Al Joyner – Olympic gold medalist in the triple jump (1984)
 George Kell – broadcaster and Hall of Fame baseball player
 Koby Arthur Koomson – Ghanaian diplomat 
 Cleo Lemon – NFL player 
 D. Price Marshall – federal judge, United States District Court for the Eastern District of Arkansas 
 J. D. McKissic – NFL player
 Ron Meeks – NFL and CFL player 
 Dennis Meyer – CFL coach 
 Josh Miller – member of the Arkansas House of Representatives from Heber Springs; obtained associate degree from ASU campus in Heber Springs
 Jerry Muckensturm – NFL player 
 David Nail – Mercury and MCA Nashville recording artist 
 Chris Odom – NFL player
 Kyle Richardson – NFL player  
 Jerry Rook – former American Basketball Association player 
 Elbert Shelley – NFL player 
 George K. Sisler – posthumous Medal of Honor recipient from Vietnam War 
 Edward J. Steimel – Louisiana business lobbyist and columnist
 Dan A. Sullivan – Republican member of the Arkansas House of Representatives for Craighead and Greene counties since 2015; played basketball for ASU 
 Kellie Suttle – Two-time Olympic pole vaulter and silver medalist at 2001 World Indoor Championships and 1999 Pan American Games 
 Charley Thornton – sports figure 
 Debbye Turner – Miss America, 1990
 Frederick C. Turner, Jr., one of first 3 Black students, first Black faculty member at ASU, Commander of SHAPE
 Dave Wallace (Class of 1970) – member of the Arkansas House of Representatives from Mississippi County; inductee of the ASU Hall of Heroes for his military service in the Vietnam War
 Corey Williams – NFL player 
 Miller Williams – poet
Ty Bodden, Wisconsin State Assembly Representative

Notable administrators

Karen Hopper, associate vice chancellor for research, special projects, and distance learning at the Mountain Home campus of ASU; former Republican member of the Arkansas House of Representatives from District 100 in Baxter County

Notes

References

External links

Arkansas State Athletics website

 
Arkansas State University System campuses
Buildings and structures in Jonesboro, Arkansas
Crowley's Ridge
Education in Craighead County, Arkansas
Natural Science Collections Alliance members
Educational institutions established in 1909
1909 establishments in Arkansas
Tourist attractions in Craighead County, Arkansas
Public universities and colleges in Arkansas